The 2015 Dalian Aerbin F.C. season was the sixth season in the club's history, and the first season after relegation from the Chinese Super League.

Background

When they were relegated from the Super League, Aerbin sold many starting players trying to minimize their expenses.

Aerbin signed Swedish manager Mikael Stahre before the season started. However, financial issue was still a tough problem for the team. As the performance was below expectation, another back pay was reported to be connected with the team.

On 8 July, Dalian Yifang Group became the major share holder of the club to gain full control of the team, before officially changed the team name to Dalian Yifang F.C.() by the end of the season.

China League One

League table

Results summary

Positions by round

League fixtures and results

Chinese FA Cup

Cup fixtures and results

Player information

Transfers

In

Out

Squad

References

Dalian Professional F.C. seasons
Dalian Aerbin F.C.